An RSMC (Regional Specialized Meteorological Center) is a component of the World Weather Watch.

RSMC may also refer to:

 Reactor Sites Management Company, a company acquired by American waste-management company EnergySolutions
 Road Safety Marshal Club (RSMC), a Malaysian safety group whose president is Captain Bala
 Ravi Shankar Music Circle, a music label used by sitar player Manilal Nag
 Rural and Suburban Mail Carriers, part of the workforce represented by the Canadian Union of Postal Workers

See also 
 RMSC (disambiguation)